Manitoba Provincial Road 340 is a provincial road in the southwestern section of the Canadian province of Manitoba.

Route description 

The route begins at PTH 2 south of Wawanesa, and terminates at the Trans-Canada Highway just north of Douglas.

PR 340 is the main road that serves CFB Shilo. The route is paved at the northern and southern ends of the route, with a large gravel section connecting CFB Shilo with Treesbank.

History 

PR 340 was originally a much longer provincial road in comparison to its current distance. In the early 1990s, the Manitoba government decommissioned a number of provincial secondary roads and returned the maintenance of these roads back to the rural municipalities. The section of the original PR 340 between Treesbank and Belmont was included in this decommissioning.

Prior to this, PR 340 started at PTH 3 near Holmfield. From this point, it traveled north, meeting PTH 23 just south of Belmont. From Belmont, PR 340 continued north, with small jaunts eastward, before meeting PTH 2 west of Glenboro. The two highways would run in a short westbound concurrence before PR 340 left the concurrence and continued north through the community of Stockton. Once it passed Stockton, PR 340 gradually turned west towards Treesbank where it turned north once again. The highway rejoined its current configuration just north of the community after a short crossing over the Assiniboine River at Treesbank Ferry.

After the decommissioning of the original route, the section of PR 340 between PTH 3 and PTH 23 was redesignated as PR 458. As well, a small section around Treesbank was redesignated as PR 530, and PR 340 was reconfigured on to a road previously designated as PR 344. It is the stretch it travels on through Wawanesa (where it meets the current PR 344) to its current southern terminus with PTH 2. The sections of the original route that were not redesignated are now maintained by the Rural Municipalities of Oakland, South Cypress, and Strathcona.

References

External links 
Manitoba Official Map - Southwest

340